Stone Librande is an American video game designer at the video game publisher Riot Games. He was the lead designer of Diablo III at Blizzard Entertainment and creative director of SimCity at Electronic Arts.

Stone is a frequent speaker at the Game Developers Conference where he has given several talks about game design:
 2009: The Paper Prototypes of Spore
 2010: One Page Designs
 2011: 15 Games in 15 Years
 2012: Designing Games for Game Designers
 2013: Simulating a City - One Page at a Time
 2015: game < design

References 

1972 births
American video game designers
Living people
Riot Games people